Galathea National Park is a national park located in the  Union Territory of Andaman and Nicobar Islands, India. It is located on the island of Great Nicobar in the Nicobar Islands, which lie in the eastern Indian Ocean (Bay of Bengal).

The total area of this park is some 110 square kilometres, and it was gazetted as a National Park of India in 1992. Galathea forms part of what has been designated as the Great Nicobar Biosphere Reserve, which also includes the larger Campbell Bay National Park, separated from Galathea by a 12-km forest buffer zone.

Many unique and rare species of plants and animals are found in the park, a number of which (owing to their relative geographical isolation) are endemic to the islands.

Flora
The vegetation consists largely of tropical and subtropical moist broadleaf forests.

Fauna
Notable animal species found in the park include the giant robber crab, megapode and Nicobar pigeon.

From February to December, the largest turtle in the world, the leather back turtle (Dermochelys coriacea), nests here.

Climate 
There is an acute tropical climate here, only with the summer season and monsoons, the inhabitants of the park here have never encountered winter conditions.

During the rainy season, an average of 3000-3800 mm of rain per square meter falls here.

Getting to Galathea National Park
The Andaman and Nicobar Islands have just one airport, Port Blair. There are daily flights to and from Port Blair to Chennai and Kolkata. The flight time is 2 hours.

Gallery

See also
 Andaman and Nicobar Environmental Team
 Society for Andaman and Nicobar Ecology

References

National parks in the Andaman and Nicobar Islands
Protected areas established in 1992
1992 establishments in the Andaman and Nicobar Islands